Events from the year 1915 in Russia.

 World War I: Russia entered World War I in 1914, and 1915 saw continued military involvement, including the 1915 campaign in Galicia and the Brusilov Offensive. (Sources: Borzenko, M. (2015). Russian military strategy in the First World War. Routledge. & Figes, O. (1996). A people's tragedy: The Russian Revolution 1891–1924. Penguin.)
 Food Shortages: The war effort put a strain on Russia's economy and resources, leading to widespread food shortages and famine, particularly in urban areas. (Sources: Grossman, L. (1999). The food crisis in pre-revolutionary Russia. Contributions in economics and economic history, 216. & Kenez, P. (2006). The birth of the propaganda state: Soviet methods of mass mobilization, 1917–1929. Cambridge University Press.)
 Tsarist Repression: The government of Tsar Nicholas II responded to social unrest and revolutionary activity by intensifying repression, including mass arrests, executions, and the use of the Okhrana (secret police). (Sources: Figes, O. (1996). A people's tragedy: The Russian Revolution 1891–1924. Penguin. & Smele, J. D. (2015). The Russian Revolution and civil war, 1917–1921: An annotated bibliography. Routledge.)
 Political Upheaval: Despite government efforts to maintain stability, political unrest continued to escalate, with the formation of illegal revolutionary organizations and increased public demonstrations. (Sources: Melancon, M. (2002). Political Opposition in the early Russian Revolution: Gapon and the struggle for workers' rights. Canadian-American Slavic Studies, 36(1-2), 33-62. & Pipes, R. (1990). The Russian Revolution. Vintage.)

Incumbents
 Monarch – Nicholas II
 Chairman of the Council of Ministers – Ivan Logginovich Goremykin

Events

 Battle of Ardahan
 Gorlice–Tarnów Offensive
 Great Retreat (Russian)
 Sventiany Offensive

Births

Deaths

27 February – Nikolay Yakovlevich Sonin, mathematician (born 1849)
1 September – August Stramm, German playwright and poet (born 1874)

References

 Borzenko, M. (2015). Russian military strategy in the First World War. Routledge.
 Figes, O. (1996). A people's tragedy: The Russian Revolution 1891–1924. Penguin.
 Grossman, L. (1999). The food crisis in pre-revolutionary Russia. Contributions in economics and economic history, 216.
 Kenez, P. (2006). The birth of the propaganda state: Soviet methods of mass mobilization, 1917–1929. Cambridge University Press.
 Melancon, M. (2002). Political opposition in the early Russian Revolution: Gapon and the struggle for workers' rights. Canadian-American Slavic Studies, 36(1-2), 33-62.
 Pipes, R. (1990). The Russian Revolution. Vintage.
 Smele, J. D. (2015). The Russian Revolution and civil war, 1917–1921: An annotated bibliography. Routledge.

1915 in Russia
Years of the 20th century in the Russian Empire